"Planes, Trains, and Cars" is the 21st episode of the third season of the American sitcom Modern Family and the series' 69th episode overall. It aired on ABC on May 2, 2012 and was written by Paul Corrigan & Brad Walsh and directed by Michael Spiller.

In the episode, Phil wants to buy a new car and despite knowing Claire would not be happy with it, he gets a two-seat convertible. Surprisingly, Claire does not react to this only because she hopes Phil will realize his mistake on his own. On a ride with Lily on the subway, Cameron and Mitchell lose her favorite stuffed rabbit. They try to convince her to choose another toy to be her favorite but she refuses, forcing them to go back to the subway and find it. Jay has to attend a college reunion and wants Gloria and Manny to go with him so he can show off his new wife to his friends, something that Gloria has no idea about. Gloria though, is afraid to travel on a small private plane and Jay is forced to drive them to the reunion.

The episode received mixed reviews from the critics.

Plot
Phil (Ty Burrell) wants to buy a new car and he takes his friend Andre (Kevin Hart) with him who convinces him to buy a two-seat convertible instead of his regular Cadillac. Despite his fear of Claire's (Julie Bowen) reaction, he decides to do it anyway. Phil gets back home in his new car. Luke (Nolan Gould) is excited seeing it but he asks if mom would be OK with it, so does Alex (Ariel Winter). Haley (Sarah Hyland) is also excited seeing the car because she believes her dad bought it for her since he is too old for that car. Surprisingly Claire does not criticize Phil's decision and hopes he will realize buying the convertible was a mistake on his own.

Due to the convertible only being a two-seater, Phil is forced to switch cars with Claire for work. Phil has to also drive/pick up the kids from school because he has the big car. Phil is mad at the fact he had to switch cars with Claire but he soon realizes that driving the kids to school and picking them up, leads to learning things about them.

Claire decides to ditch her chores and to take the convertible to the coast for some time to herself to calm down. She soon loses the keys on the beach and Phil later arrives with a spare. The two spend time together and agree to make time for one another from now on.

Cameron (Eric Stonestreet) and Mitchell (Jesse Tyler Ferguson) decide to take Lily (Aubrey Anderson-Emmons) on a ride on the subway to Chinatown but they lose her favorite stuffed rabbit. They try to get Lily to choose a new favorite out of her other toys, but she refuses. Cameron and Mitchell are therefore forced to go to desperate lengths to get the stuffed rabbit back, including putting up flyers in the subway and offering a reward for its safe return. They soon decide that Lily will have to deal with her loss when they discover the stuffed animal has been in the care of a homeless man.

Meanwhile, Jay (Ed O'Neill) is ecstatic to take Gloria (Sofía Vergara) and Manny (Rico Rodriguez) on a trip to his college reunion as he claims he was considered somewhat of a legend by his fellow students. Jay is irritated when he is forced to drive them there due to Gloria's refusal to ride in a small airplane. On their way there, one of the tires punctures and they are once again forced to find an alternative way to travel to the reunion. Gloria is hesitant to go and wants to return home until she realizes Jay is so excited to go because he wants to show his new family off to his old friends, who all used to think that Jay would not amount to much. Gloria agrees to go with him, happy to play the trophy wife role.

Reception

Ratings 
In its original American broadcast, "Planes, Trains and Cars" was watched by 10.06 million; slightly down from the previous episode, with an adult 18-49 rating/share of 4.0/11.

Reviews 
The episode receive mixed reviews from critics.

Wyner C of Two Cents TV gave a good review to the episode saying that it was awesome. "This was an awesome episode!!! The first 15 minutes had so many one-liners! I don’t know how to choose my favorite. Great episode!! I laughed out loud at least 5 times."

Donna Bowman of The A.V. Club gave the episode a C rate, bemoaning the lack of a unifying theme between the three stories, and called the Mitchell and Cameron storyline "horrifyingly realistic".

Leigh Raines of TV Fanatic rated the episode with 4.5/5, summing up the overall episode by saying "coming off of an episode that I personally was not a fan of, I can honestly say that, while not sidesplittingly hilarious, this outing did leave me with a smile".

Christine N. Ziemba of Paste Magazine gave the episode 6.6/10 saying that the episode was overall "mediocre". She criticized the character of Gloria, stating that "we know that Gloria has often used her, ahem, assets to get what she wants, but it’s a little degrading to watch her objectified". Ziemba was also critical of Manny's role in the episode. She said "Manny wasn't quite himself either, turning from a sensitive old soul, who’s wise beyond his years, into a snotty brat".

Michael Adams of 411mania gave the episode 7/10. "I liked Mitchell this week. [...] The Cam/Mitchell story was minimal, however, it was very funny and touching and Mitch had a lot of great lines. [...] I also loved Mitchell's response when he thought Cam was yelling at him for calling the guy homeless. Good stuff. I think Jesse Tyler Ferguson will get an Emmy nomination this year, however, I don't think they've given him enough good material for the win. Shame."

References

External links 
 
 "Planes, Trains and Cars" at ABC.com

2012 American television episodes
Modern Family (season 3) episodes